commonly known as Kōchi United SC (高知ユナイテッドSC, Kōchi Yunaiteddo Esushi) is a football club based in Kōchi, the capital city of Kōchi Prefecture in Japan. They play in the Japan Football League, Japan's fourth tier of semi-professional football league.

History 

On February 1, 2016, two established Shikoku League clubs; Igosso Kōchi FC (アイゴッソ高知FC) and Kōchi U Torastar FC (高知UトラスターFC) merged to form one club, whose aim was to be the first team from Kōchi Prefecture to play in the J. League. 
After officially changing the management company's name to Kōchi United Sports Club Ltd., Kochi United SC took Igosso Kōchi FC's place in the Shikoku League. For the many players at Kōchi U Torastar FC unable to join Kochi United SC, and wanting to continue playing as amateurs in the Shikoku League, Kochi Sports Club Ltd. and Kochi University established KUFC Nangoku on March 1, 2016, and this new club took Kōchi U Torastar FC's place in the Shikoku League.
The club badge depicts the ceremonial Keshō-mawashi (化粧廻し) of a Tosa Fighting Dog on the outside, with the dark red colors of Igosso Kochi FC and the green of Kōchi U Torastar inside it and an image of a leaping bonito or skipjack tuna drawn in the center (a popular fish in Kochi prefecture). The club's home shirt also reflects the colors of the amalgamated teams from which Kochi United SC was formed.

They played in the Shikoku Soccer League, one of the Japanese Regional Leagues from 2016–2019, winning it three times in a row from 2017–19. In 2019 they finished 2nd in the Japanese Regional Football League Competition, earning promotion to the Japan Football League from the 2020 season. In November 2021 they applied for J.League 100 Year Plan club status with the aim of becoming a fully professional club in the future. In February 2022 their application was approved.

As Igosso Kōchi FC

Postwar-1966: Kōchi Agricultural High School O.B. Club (高知農業高校OBクラブ).
1966-1996: Nangoku Soccer Club (Shikoku League Champions:1980).
1996-1999: Himawari Milk Nangoku F.C. (ひまわり牛乳南国FC).
1999-2014: Nangoku Kōchi F.C. (Shikoku League Champions: 2001, 2002. 2003, 2004, 2005).
2014-2016: Igosso Kōchi.

As Kōchi U Torastar FC

1998-2000: Transistor (トランジェスター).
2000-2006: Torastar (トラスター).
2006-2008: Beiling Torastar (北陵トラスター).
2008-2013: Nankoku Torastar (南国トラスターFC).
2013-2016: Kōchi U Torastar FC (Shikoku League Champions: 2014)

2016 season
In their inaugural 2016 season they finished runners up in the Shikoku League (W12-D1-L1) to FC Imabari (FC今治) . They also qualified for the All Japan Senior Football Championship (全国社会人サッカー選手権大会 Zenkoku Shakaijin Sakkā Senshuken Taikai), but lost 4–3 in the first round to eventual winners Mitsubishi Mizushima FC (三菱水島 FC). In addition, they represented Kōchi in the Emperor's Cup (天皇杯 Tennōhai) breaking Kochi University's 13 year streak, but lost 2–1 in the first round proper to V-Varen Nagasaki (V・ファーレン長崎) of the J2 League having taken a shock lead with a Kota Sugawara penalty. Takuya Kobayashi was the top goalscorer with 17 goals in all competitions.

2017 season
In the 2017 season they won the Shikoku League with a W12-D2-L0 record, thus qualifying for the Japanese Regional Football League Competition (全国地域サッカーチャンピオンズリーグ Zenkoku Chiiki Sakkā Championzu Līgu). They were drawn in Group B for the tournament alongside Amitie SC Kyoto (now Ococias Kyoto AC おこしやす京都AC), FC TIAMO Hirakata (FCティアモ枚方) of the Kansai Soccer League, and Mitsubishi Mizushima FC of the Chūgoku Soccer League. They lost 1–0 against Kansai Champions Amitie SC Kyoto in their first match, but won their second game 2–1 against FC TIAMO Hirakata. In their final match they thrashed Mitsubishi Mizushima (6 times Chugoku League champions) 5–2, but it wasn't enough to win the group or qualify for the final stage as best runners up. Still, it was a fine overall performance in their first appearance in the tournament. In the Emperor's Cup they represented Kochi again, but went out in the first round proper for the second consecutive season, losing 2–1 to Verspah Oita (ヴェルスパ大分) of the Japan Football League, after leading with a Tsubasa Yokotake goal. In the All Japan Senior Football Championship first round, they led at half time but ended up losing 3–1 to Vonds Ichihara (VONDS市原). The top scorer for the season was Kota Sugawara with 23 goals in all competitions.

2018 season
In the 2018 season they retained their Shikoku League title despite one loss to FC Tokushima, and won the Kochi Prefectural Football Championship again with a 3–0 win against KUFC Nangoku in the final. In the first round proper of the Emperor's Cup, they defeated Mitsubishi Mizushima FC 2-0 at home, then faced Albirex Niigata (アルビレックス新潟) of the J2 League away in the second round. After a 0-0 draw at Denka Big Swan Stadium, one of the venues for the 2002 World Cup, they lost 5-3 on penalties in front of 2241 fans. In the All Japan Senior Football Championship they lost 3-0 away in the first round to Suzuka Unlimited FC (鈴鹿アンリミテッドFC). Finally, in the season ending Japanese Regional Football League Competition they disappointingly lost all three matches in the group stages against Blancdieu Hirosaki FC: 3-2, Hokkaido Tokachi Sky Earth: 3-0 and FC Kariya: 2-1 respectively. The joint top scorers in all competitions were Kazuki Nakabayashi and Ryo Taguchi with 16 goals.

2019 season
The 2019 season was a breakthrough season for Kochi United. They won the Shikoku League for the third straight season with a 100% record and retained the Kochi Prefectural Football Championship, though they needed an extra-time winner to beat KUFC Nangoku in the final. In the first round proper they defeated MD Nagasaki (MD長崎) at home 1-0 in front of over 400 fans, but lost 2-1 away after extra-time to V-Varen Nagasaki of J2 in the second round. They failed to qualify for the first round proper of the All Japan Senior Football Championship after losing in the regional playoffs to FC Tokushima. However, in the Japanese Regional Football League Competition their luck changed. With home advantage in the group stages, they beat Blancdieu Hirosaki FC 2-1 in their opening group game. In their second match they thrashed SRC Hiroshima 7–0 and although they lost the final group game 2-0 to Ococias Kyoto AC, they still qualified for the final round. Things didn't look good when they lost the first game of the final stage 3-0 to Iwaki FC, but they responded well in the second match with a 3–1 victory over Fukui United FC. That meant they went into a winner-takes-all final match against Ococias Kyoto who they had lost to earlier on in the competition. This time, they emerged victorious with a stunning 3-1 win to get their revenge and finish second in the competition, thus earning promotion to the Japan Football League; the first time a team from Kochi had achieved that feat.

2020 season

Japan Football League 
 v Tokyo Musashino City FC H: D 1-1 (Shimodo). (First ever match in JFL)
 v Nara Club A: D 1-1 (Nagao)
 v Matsue City FC A: L 2-1 (Shimodo)
 v FC Maruyasu Okazaki H: L 0-2
 v Iwaki FC A: L 4-3 (Hirata, Nagao, Izumi)
 v Honda Lock SC H: L 0-1.
 v Suzuka Point Getters H: D 2-2 (Akahoshi, Fujisaki)
 v Sony Sendai FC A: L 3-1 (Tsuboi)
 v Verspah Oita H: L 0-1
 v Honda F.C. A: W 0-1 (Akahoshi). (First JFL win)
 v Tegevajaro Miyazaki H: L 0-2
 v MIO Biwako Shiga H: W 3-0 (Yokotake (pen), Akahoshi, Taguchi). (First home JFL win)
 v FC Osaka A: W 0-2 (Akahoshi 2). (First back-to-back JFL wins)
 v ReinMeer Aomori H: D 1-1 (Akahoshi)
 v Veertien Mie A: W 0-1 (Fujisaki)

Emperor's Cup 
 Kochi Prefectural Football Championship Final v Kochi University: W 2-0 (Maeda 2). Fifth consecutive title
 Second Round: v Takamatsu University: W 2-1 (Akahoshi, Izumi)
 Third Round: v F.C Tokushima: W 2-0 (Taguchi, Nagao)
 Fourth Round: v Tsukuba University: L 3-2 AET (Akahoshi 2)

2021 season

Japan Football League 
 v Verspah Oita (A) W 0-1 (Nishimura Yuta)
 v ReinMeer Aomori (H) W 2-1 (Nagao, Izumi)
 v FC Osaka (A) L 2-1 (Akahoshi)
 v Sony Sendai FC (H) L 1-2 (Tanaka Shoma)
 v Suzuka Point Getters (A) L 2-1 (Shimodo)
 v Iwaki FC (A) L 3-2 (Nishimura Koji 2)
 v FC TIAMO Hirakata (H) W 1-0 (Shimodo)
 v FC Maruyasu Okazaki (A) W 1-2 (Nishimura Yuta, Akahoshi)
 v Veertien Mie (H) W 3-1 (Fujii, Nagao, Nishimura Yuta) (First 3 straight wins in JFL)
 v MIO Biwako Shiga (A) L 1-0
 v Honda Lock SC (H) W 1-0 (Nishimura Yuta)
 v Nara Club (H) L 0-2
 v Honda FC (A) L 5-0
 v FC Kariya (H) L 1-4 (Lucas)
 v Matsue City FC (A) L 4-0
 v Tokyo Musashino City FC (H) W 1-0 (Nishimura Yuta)
 v ReinMeer Aomori (A) D 2-2 (Nagao, Hosoyama)
 v Verspah Oita (H) L 1-2 (Akahoshi)
 v Iwaki FC (H) D 0-0
 v FC TIAMO Hirakata (A) L 2-1 (Tanaka Shoma)
 v FC Maruyasu Okazaki (H) D 1-1 (Lucas)
 v Veertien Mie (A) W 0-3 (Nishimura Yuta 2, Nakamasu). (Biggest away win in JFL. First double)
 v MIO Biwako Shiga (H) D 0-0
 v Honda Lock SC (A) L 3-2 (Akahoshi, Lucas)
 v FC Kariya (A) L 2-1 (Shimodo)
 v Honda FC (H) D 0-0
 v Sony Sendai FC (A) W 0-1 (OG)
 v FC Osaka (H) L 0-1
 v Tokyo Musashino City FC (A) L 2-0
 v Matsue City FC (H) L 0-1
 v Nara Club (A) D 0-0. (Secured JFL safety)
 v Suzuka Point Getters (H) L 1-5 (Akahoshi)

Emperor's Cup 
 Kochi Prefectural Football Championship Final v Kochi University (H): W 2-1 (Nishimura Yuta 2). Sixth consecutive title
 First Round v Kamatamare Sanuki (H): W 1-0 (Fujii). First ever win over J-League opposition
 Second Round v Tokushima Vortis (A): L 1-2 (Shimodo). First goal scored against J1 opposition

2022 season

Japan Football League 
 v Tokyo Musashino United FC (H) D 1-1 (Koji Nishimura)
 v Honda Lock SC (A) W 0-1 (Yuta Nishimura)
 v Sony Sendai FC (H) D 0-0
 v FC TIAMO Hirakata (A) D 1-1 (Higuchi)
 v Honda FC (H) L 0-2
 v Verspah Oita (A) W 0-1 (Koji Nishimura)
 v Veertien Mie (H) D 1-1 (Akahoshi)
 v Nara Club (H) L 0-1
 v FC Osaka (A) L 3-2 (Daisuke Okada, Akahoshi)
 v FC Kagura Shimane (H) W 1-0 (Akahoshi). (First win v Shimane)
 v Suzuka Point Getters (A) L 1-0
 v MIO Biwako Shiga (H) D 1-1 (Akahoshi)
 v ReinMeer Aomori (A) D 0-0
 v FC Maruyasu Okazaki (H) L 3-5 (Koji Nishimura, Akahoshi 2)
 v Criacao Shinjuku (A) W 0-1 (Fujisaki)
 v Tokyo Musashino United FC (A) W 1-3 (Akahoshi, Yokotake, Higuchi)
 v Honda Lock SC (H) W 3-0 (Yamada, Koji Nishimura, Akahoshi)
 v Nara Club (A) L 2-0
 v FC Osaka (H) L 1-2 (Yuta Nishimura)
 v FC Kagura Shimane (A) W 1-2 (Inazumi 2)
 v Suzuka Point Getters (H) W 2-0 (Inazumi, Tajiri). (First win v Suzuka)
 v Honda FC (A) L 2-0
 v FC TIAMO Hirakata (H) W 2-1 (Koji Nishimura, Aiba)
 v Sony Sendai FC (A) D 1-1 (Akahoshi)
 v Criacao Shinjuku (H) L 0-1
 v FC Maruyasu Okazaki (A) L 3-0
 v Veertien Mie (A) L 3-1 (Yuta Nishimura). (First loss v Mie)
 v Verspah Oita (H) L 2-3 (Higuchi, Akahoshi)
 v MIO Biwako Shiga (A) L 1-0
 v ReinMeer Aomori (H) L 0-2

Emperor's Cup 
 Kochi Prefectural Football Championship Final: v KUFC Nangoku: W 2-0 (Koji Nishimura 2). Seventh consecutive title
 First Round: v Brew KASHIMA (A) W 0-2 (Yamada, Yuta Nishimura)
 Second Round: v Kyoto Sanga FC (A) L 1-3 AET (Akahoshi)

Current squad 
Updated to 17 March 2023.

Coaching staff

League and Cup record 

Key

Managerial history

All-time competitive record table 
Updated to November 2022

All-time top ten record goalscorers
Updated to November 2022

Honours 
 Shikoku Soccer League: Champions (3)
 2017, 2018, 2019

 Kochi Prefectural Football Championship: Winners (7)

 2016, 2017, 2018, 2019, 2020, 2021, 2022

Japanese Regional Football League Competition: Runners Up (1)
 2019

Records 
Record home victory: 11-0 v Rossorise KFC (Emperor's Cup Regional Round, 2017) & v Koyo Sealing Techno (Shikoku Soccer League, 2019).
Record away victory: 0-14 v Koyo Sealing Techno (Shikoku Soccer League 2019).
Record away defeat: 5-0 v Honda FC (JFL 2021).
Record home defeat: 1-5 v Suzuka Point Getters (JFL 2021).
Longest winning streak (all comps): 13 games (2017–18 and 2019 season).
Longest losing streak (all comps): 6 games (JFL 2022).
Most goals by one player in a game: 4 (Takuya Kobayashi: SSL 2016, Kazuki Nakabayashi: AJSFC 2017, Paulo Sousa: SSL 2018, Ryo Taguchi: SSL 2019, Hiroki Maehara: SSL 2019).
Most career goals for Kochi United SC: 57 (Hiroki Maehara).
Most hat-tricks for Kochi United SC: 5 (Kota Sugawara, Ryo Taguchi, Hiroki Maehara).
Record home attendance: 3305 v Suzuka Point Getters (JFL 2022).

References

External links 
Official Website 
Official Facebook Page 

Football clubs in Japan
Sports teams in Kōchi Prefecture
Kōchi
Japan Football League clubs